Orton Reef is a reef with a least depth of 2 ft in the north part of Newcomb Bay, located 0.5 nautical miles (0.9 km) north of Molholm Island in the Windmill Islands. Discovered and charted in February 1957 by a party from the USS Wilkes Station, who assisted in an ANARE (Australian National Antarctic Research Expeditions) survey of Newcomb Bay in the 1961–62 season.

Reefs of Antarctica
Landforms of Wilkes Land